Óscar Nogués Farré (born 21 May 1978 in Banyeres del Penedès) is a Spanish auto racing driver. He won the Spanish SEAT León Supercopa in 2005 and 2006, and won the inaugural SEAT León Eurocup in 2008. He made one-off appearances in the World Touring Car Championship in 2006, 2007 and 2008 as rewards for his efforts in SEAT one-make series. He came second in the European Touring Car Cup to Michel Nykjaer in 2008. He also won at 2009 Les 24 hores de Barcelona with team Sunred Seven.

Racing record

Complete World Touring Car Championship results
(key) (Races in bold indicate pole position) (Races in italics indicate fastest lap)

Complete TCR International Series results
(key) (Races in bold indicate pole position) (Races in italics indicate fastest lap)

References

1978 births
Living people
Spanish racing drivers
World Touring Car Championship drivers
SEAT León Eurocup drivers
Eurocup Mégane Trophy drivers
European Touring Car Cup drivers
TCR International Series drivers
Campos Racing drivers

Cupra Racing drivers